Stange Commons (Bokmål: Stange almenning) is a municipal commons in the south of Stange municipality in the county of Innlandet, Norway. The common area stretched from the lake Mjøsa eastward to the traditional district of Odal (the modern municipalities of Sør-Odal and Nord-Odal). The Stange Commons and the Romedal Commons are municipality commons located adjacent to one another in central Hedmark county. The boundaries of the commons stretch from Akershus in the south, along the Mjøsa to the west, to Hamar in the west and north and to Solør in the east. The Romedal Commons has a total area of 2,450 km² there and Stange Commons has a total area of 1,250 km².

History 
In 1668 king Frederik III sold the Stange common area to chief district judge Nils Toller, who was interested in the lumber rights, with right of redemption by the king (see Odelsrett). On 29 August 1759 records show that it was auctioned and the king's right of redemption was exercised. King Christian VII again sold an area amounting to much of the current commons on 8 January 1789 to the Anker family for 15,155 Dano-Norwegian rigsdalers. The Anchors lumber business suffered economic setbacks and they sold it at auction along with the Morskogen and 17 lesser locations for 5,000 Norwegian speciedaler to settle encumbrances in 1822. It was purchased by the majority of the residents of Stange (112 farms) for use as a public commons. All the registered Stange farms except the priests farm, the church farm of  Lundgård, the residence of Kjemstad and the farm of Huse participated in the purchase and received the rights to use the commons. More land has been purchased and added to the commons in recent years.

External links 
 Romedal and Stange commons

References 
Translated from the Norwegian Wikipedia (see interwiki link). 

Forests and woodlands of Norway
Geography of Innlandet
Stange